"Lady of Knock" (Irish: Banthiarna Cnoic) is a Marian hymn to Our Lady of Knock, written by Irish singer Dana Rosemary Scallon. The hymn is popular with some Irish Catholics, especially at funeral services. The song tells of the story of Knock in County Mayo, Ireland, where there was an apparation of the Virgin Mary, Saint Joseph, and Saint John the Evangelist at the south gable of Knock Parish Church in 1879.

In 2018, a performance of the song went viral when Irish singer Cathy Maguire performed the song when Cardinal Timothy Dolan invited her to St Patrick’s Cathedral, New York City.

Versions
1981 - Dana released it as a single
1995 - Frank Patterson
2003 - Daniel O'Donnell released it on Songs of Faith
2010 - Susan Boyle performed it onstage with Daniel O'Donnell at his concert in Castlebar, Ireland
2018 - Cathy Maguire sang it on St Patrick’s Day in St Patrick’s Cathedral
2022 - An Italian student records the first full rendition of the song in Italian,

References

Marian hymns
Irish songs